The Auteur  is a 2008 American independent mockumentary directed and written by James Westby.

The film premiered at 2008 Tribeca Film Festival.

Cast 
 Melik Malkasian	as 	Arturo Domingo 
 Denise Chanterelle DuBois	as  Margaret le Plage 
 Loren Hoskins	as 	Manny Davis 
 John Breen	as 	Frank E. Normo 
 Cara Seymour	as 	Doris  
 Ron Jeremy	as  himself

References

External links
 

2008 films
American mockumentary films
Films about pornography
2000s mockumentary films
Films set in Portland, Oregon
Films shot in Portland, Oregon
2008 comedy films
2000s English-language films
2000s American films